Jangpur is a village of Ludhiana District in Punjab, India. It had a population of around 2,738 in 2011 Indian census, most of whom are engaged in agricultural work. The village is located approximately eighteen kilometres south-west of Ludhiana, and two kilometres from Grand Trunk Road.

2011 Census Chart

Religious places, festivities and sports

Jangpur proudly contains a range of worship spaces. For instance it has two Sikh Gurdwaras, a Hindu Mandir and Mata Rani, a Sufi Khanqah or Khaneh-gah (literally — 'house of the present time'), a Muslim Masjid and unaffiliated (non-orthodoxic) Asthaan Baabe Shaheedan (literally — 'place of the martyr elders').

It holds a ton of religious and non-religious events and the youngsters show a great passion for sports especially Football (Soccer) The village has its own football team called Jangpur Football Club JFC.

References

External links
About Jangpur
Jangpur Football Club (JFC)

Villages in Ludhiana district
Villages in Ludhiana West tehsil